Nagle is a surname. It may also refer to:

 Nagle, Missouri, United States, a ghost town
 Nagle Dam, on the Mgeni River, KwaZulu-Natal, South Africa
 Nagle College, an independent Roman Catholic co-educational secondary day school in Bairnsdale, Victoria, Australia
 Nagle Catholic College, an independent Roman Catholic co-educational secondary day school in Geraldton, Western Australia, Australia
 Nagle baronets, an extinct title in the Baronetage of the United Kingdom

See also
 Nagel (disambiguation)